Marlow is an unincorporated community in Dunklin County, in the U.S. state of Missouri.

The community has the name of James and Toby Marlow, original owners of the site.

References

Unincorporated communities in Dunklin County, Missouri
Unincorporated communities in Missouri